JUN, or JUN Auto, is a Japanese tuning shop. JUN began as the research facility of Tanaka Industrial Co. Ltd. Originally focused on disassembling and improving engines, JUN now manufactures high performance car parts.

Products
JUN manufactures aftermarket performance parts and engines for Japanese cars. They make parts such as piston kits, stroker kits, valves and Plenums.

World records
In 1991, JUN attended the Bonneville Speed trials at the Bonneville Salt Flats (see also Bonneville Speedway) with a Z32 Nissan 300ZX that was extensively modified. JUN was able to record a speed of 422 km/h (262 mph),
which was a world record for a “road”-going car.

JUN returned to Bonneville a year later with the intent of improving on their world record. This time they used a JUN-Blitz Nissan 300ZX. In the E/BMS class, JUN set a record of 419.84 km/h (260.87 mp/h), becoming world champions for that particular class (which was later reclassified as E/BGMS). This record remains unbroken. The record was verified by the SCTA (Southern California Timing Association) website, Bonneville records page, under Blown Gas Modified Sports, ; this page was checked July 2009.

JUN also competed in the All Japan Grand Touring Car Championship (JGTC) series as well as in drifting in Japan and the USA.

International partnerships
While JUN does not advertise in the international market, they have partnered with automotive performance companies and race teams around the world, choosing to let their international partners push their products. Through these partnerships, they have provided special engines that have been made and in some cases entire Demo Cars made by JUN.

References

External links
 JUN Auto Home Page

Auto parts suppliers of Japan
Automotive motorsports and performance companies
Japanese auto racing teams